On 28 February 2023, a head-on collision occurred between two trains south of the Tempe Valley in Greece, about halfway between the Greek towns of Tempi and Evangelismos in the Thessaly region. The collision, involving the InterCity 62 (IC62) passenger train and an intermodal freight train, killed at least 57 people, with an official number of 342 passengers and 10 onboard railroad staff on the passenger train and 2 staff on the freight train totalling 354 passengers on both trains. It is the deadliest rail disaster in Greek history.

It was discovered that the IC62 passenger train was allowed to proceed on the wrong track and pass signals at danger despite the presence of the freight train on the same track.

Vigils, angry protests, and clashes with the police occurred throughout Greece following the accident. Beginning on 2 March 2023, railway workers of Hellenic Train and the Athens Metro went on strike to protest the dangers related to the crash. Following the accident, Transport Minister Kostas Karamanlis resigned, taking responsibility for the crash and for his failure to bring Greek railways to 21st-century standards.

Background 
The IC62 passenger train was operated by Hellenic Train, a subsidiary of Ferrovie dello Stato Italiane, and consisted of a rake of Hellenic Train UICZ1 coaches made by Siemens at SGP Graz and Bombardier at Dunakeszi Carriage Workshops, based on the Viaggio Classic platform (which itself is based on the ÖBB Modularwagen), pulled by Hellas Sprinter locomotive class 120023. The train was scheduled to arrive at Thessaloniki station at 11:35 p.m.EET. The freight train number 63503 was pulled by Hellas Sprinter locomotives class 120012 and class 120022, and was towing flatcars loaded with sheet steel and shipping containers.

Earlier on the same day, an explosion in the electricity network at Palaiofarsalos railway station had caused the overhead line to fall on another intercity train, leading to several delays on the line. The crash site was next to an overpass of the A1 motorway, on a stretch of line that opened in 2003 as part of a reconstruction of the Larissa to Thessaloniki segment of the main line.

Implementation of the European Train Control System (ETCS) was initially planned for 2020 but was delayed to late 2023. In 2019 telematics in Larissa ceased to work due to a summer wildfire. This collision followed a series of other rail accidents that had no casualties.

Collision 
The IC62 passenger train, which was scheduled to depart from Athens to Thessaloniki at 7:22 p.m. Eastern European Time (UTC+2), left a few minutes behind schedule at approximately 7:30 p.m., carrying around 350 passengers. Many of the passengers were students in their20s returning after the long weekend of Greek Orthodox Lent celebrations. The IC62 arrived in Larissa late due to the earlier incident at Palaiofarsalos station and left the station at 11:00 p.m., departing on the southbound track. At the same time, the freight train was proceeding from Thessaloniki to Larissa on the same southbound track that the IC62 was on.

The collision between the two trains occurred at 11:21 pm on the Athens-Thessaloniki mainline, which is operated by OSE, the Greek national railway company. The passenger train and the freight train collided head-on halfway between the multiplicities of Tempi and Evangelismos just before midnight, as the passenger train was exiting the tunnel under the E75 roadway that crossed over the tracks.

In an interview with ERT, the governor of the Thessaly region, Kostas Agorastos, reported that the first four carriages of the passenger train were derailed, and the first two carriages caught fire and were "almost completely destroyed". Passengers reportedly escaped the train through windows that were either broken in the crash or by themselves. Many panicked and some were trapped in carriages that were tilted at least 45degrees. Rescuers were able to open some of the car doors. The force of the impact was able to completely destroy the locomotive of the passenger train while the locomotives of the freight train were pushed against the freight cars they were towing.

Numerous train cars caught fire following the collision, and 17vehicles and 150firefighters worked to extinguish the flames. Meanwhile, rescue efforts were made with the assistance of 40ambulances, and over 30police officers at the site. The wreckage was so extensive that crane trucks were used to help extricate carriages. The Hellenic Army was called upon to assist. About 250 surviving passengers, including those with minor injuries, were evacuated from the collision site by bus to Thessaloniki.

Victims 
At least 57 people were killed, and 80 others were injured, with 25 of them suffering serious injuries. Of the injured, 66 were hospitalized, with six being admitted to intensive care units. Six Albanians, two Cypriot students, a Romanian and a Bangladeshi are among the dead. The rail disaster is the deadliest in Greek history.

Aftermath 
An emergency meeting was called by Greece's government following the crash, and Health Minister Thanos Plevris visited the scene. President Katerina Sakellaropoulou cut short her visit to Moldova to offer support to the victims. EMAK (Greek special disaster management unit) were ordered to stop all operations on site for Katerina Sakellaropoulou to better understand the accident. She was later captured throwing flowers inside the yet to be fully investigated burned wagons. Transport Minister Kostas Achilleas Karamanlis resigned after the train crash, stating at the scene of the accident that it was his responsibility to do so "as a basic indication of respect for the memory of the people who died so unfairly", and that he had "failed to bring the railway system to 21st century standards". Later in the week, at a government official statement, it was clarified that there is no intention for Kostas Achilleas Karamanlis to not rerun for the upcoming elections with New Democracy setting off protests at the local area of Karamanlis's electoral perfecture. Minister of State Giorgos Gerapetritis was appointed Transport Minister after the accident.

Investigation 
Following the collision, police questioned two rail officials and one of them, Larissa's stationmaster, Vassilis Samaras, who was working at this post only for 5 days (consecutive nights) and apparently alone while on shift  was detained and charged with causing death and injury through negligence. Stamatis Daskalopoulos, Larissa's public prosecutor, who was assigned by Supreme Court prosecutor Isidoros Dogiakos to handle the investigation, stated that while the probe is still in its early stages, the authorities would continue to analyze all evidence and bring justice to whoever is responsible. The Larissa railway station manager admitted to allowing the train through a red signal, but claimed that the switch from the up line (northbound) to the down line (southbound) had not been working, and argued that the passenger train should have stayed on the up line to avoid the freight train. It was later discovered that the stationmaster at Larissa had been informed that a freight train was on the southbound track around 17 minutes prior to the accident occurring, and these entries were found in a ledger.

The tragedy occurred amid years of multiple warnings from the train drivers' official body while the current government was passing legislation to make drivers' ability to take industrial action for safety unlawful  and amid growing demands for the approval by the Parliament of the Rail Accident Investigation Board, an independent body tasked with investigating accidents causing death, serious injuries, or extensive damage on the Greek railway network. It is required by EU law, and Greece was brought to court over it two weeks before the accident. Three weeks before the crash, the rail workers' union had pointed out problems with the administration of the rail network which could put the passengers in danger.

Reactions 
Following the train crash, the Greek government declared a three-day period of mourning, during which all flags were flown at half-mast, and celebratory events were postponed. The president of the train drivers' association, Kostas Genidounias, said that the electronic systems that warn drivers of danger have not been functional for some years. "Nothing works, everything is done manually. We are 'in manual mode' throughout the Athens-Thessaloniki network," he stated.

Former Greek finance minister Yanis Varoufakis blamed the crash on railway privatization, comparing it to the Ladbroke Grove rail crash that occurred in London in 1999. Critics blame a lack of public investment during the deep financial crisis that spanned most of the previous decade for the rail disaster.

Flags outside the European Commission building in Brussels were also lowered to half-mast the morning after the accident. Albania declared 5 March a national day of mourning with flags at half-mast in the country. Additionally, the Albanian Parliament observed a minute of silence.

Protests 

Vigils, heated protests, and riots took place in throughout Greece following the catastrophe, and the catchphrase "Pare me otan ftaseis" ("Give me a call when you arrive") became the main protest slogan. In response to both the tragedy and growing dissatisfaction of the industry at large, the Panhellenic Union of Train Personnel walked out in protest of working conditions and the failure to modernise the rail network, starting their strike on 2March 2023, despite the STASY metro workers' union suspending planned strike action on the Athens Metro out of respect for the victims the previous day. Scuffles broke out in Athens with police firing tear gas into crowds that gathered in front of the Hellenic Train's headquarters. On 7 March, many schools in Thessaloniki were locked down by the students, forcing the schools to move to online class via Webex for a couple of days. A 24-hour general strike was called by the Greek Civil Servants' Confederation (ADEDY) to occur on 8 March 2023.

See also 
List of rail accidents in Greece
List of rail accidents (2020–present)

References 

2023 disasters in Greece
Derailments in Greece
February 2023 events in Greece
History of rail transport in Greece
Larissa (regional unit)
Modern history of Thessaly
Rail transport in Thessaly
Railway accidents in 2023
Train collisions in Greece
Railway accidents involving a signal passed at danger